Alexander (killed 314 BC) was a son of Polyperchon, the regent of Macedonia, and an important general in the Wars of the Diadochi.

Alexander in Athens
Antipater, on his death in 319 BC, had left the regency to Polyperchon, to the exclusion and consequent discontent of his own son, Cassander. Those who had been placed in authority by Antipater in the garrisoned towns of Greece, were favourably disposed to Cassander, as their patron's son, and Polyperchon's policy, therefore, was to reverse the measures of Antipater, and restore democracy where Antipater had abolished it. To implement this plan Polyperchon's son, Alexander, was sent to Athens during 318, with the aim of delivering the city from Nicanor, who had been appointed by Cassander to command the garrison placed in Munychia by Antipater.

Before Alexander's arrival, Nicanor strengthening his position in Munychia with fresh troops and had also treacherously seized Piraeus. Alexander had the same intentions, intentions which he had probably formed before he had any communication with Phocion, though Diodorus seems to imply the contrary. The Athenians, however, looked on Phocion as the author of the design, and their suspicions and anger were further excited by the private conferences between Alexander and Nicanor.   As a result, Phocion was accused of treason, and, fleeing with several of his friends to Alexander, was despatched by Alexander to Polyperchon.

Cassander arrived in Athens soon after and occupied Piraeus. There he was besieged by Polyperchon with a large force. However, Polyperchon's forces lacked adequate supplies, so he was obliged to withdraw a portion of his army.  Polyperchon used this army to attempt the reduction of Megalopolis, while Alexander was left in command of the remaining forces in Athens. However, it appears he achieved little, until the treaty and capitulation of Athens to Cassander.

Alexander in the Peloponnese
When Polyperchon, baffled at Megalopolis, withdrew into Macedonia, his son seems to have been left with an army in the Peloponnese, where, according to Diodorus the field was left open to him. The friends of oligarchy were greatly alarmed by the departure of Cassander to Macedonia following the murder of Philip Arrhidaeus and Eurydice by Olympias during 317. During Cassander's absence, Alexander succeeded captured several cities and important places in the Peloponnese. However, on Cassander's return to the south, after crushing Olympias in Macedonia, Alexander attempted in vain to check Cassander by his fortification of the Isthmus of Corinth. Instead Cassander, passed to Epidaurus by sea, regained Argos and Hermione, and afterwards also the Messenian towns, with the exception of Ithome.

Alliances with Antigonus and then Cassander
In the next year, 315 BC, Antigonus (whose ambition and successes in the east had united Cassander, Lysimachus, Asander, and Ptolemy against him), sent Aristodemus into the Peloponnese to form an alliance with Polyperchon and Alexander.  Alexander was persuaded by Aristodemus to travel to Asia for a personal conference with Antigonus. Finding Antigonus in Tyre, a treaty was made between them, and Alexander returned to Greece with a present of 500 talents from Antigonus, and a multitude of magnificent promises. Yet, in the very same year, Alexander renounced his alliance with Antigonus and was bribed with the title of governor of the Peloponnese to reconcile himself to Cassander.

Alexander's death
In the ensuing year, 314 BC, Alexander engaged in the siege of Cyllene on behalf of Cassander. However, this siege was raised by Aristodemus and his Aetolian allies. After the return of Aristodemus to Aetolia, the citizens of Dyme, in Achaia, besieged the citadel, which was occupied by one of Cassander's garrisons. Alexander forced his way into the city and made himself master of it, punishing the opposing inhabitants with death, imprisonment, or exile. Very soon after this he was murdered at Sicyon by Alexion, a Sicyonian, leaving the command of his forces to his wife Cratesipolis who proved herself fully adequate to the task.

Notes

References
Smith, William (editor); Dictionary of Greek and Roman Biography and Mythology, "Alexander", Boston, (1867)

Ancient Tymphaeans
Ancient Greek generals
Ancient Macedonian generals
Generals of Polyperchon
Ancient Macedonians in Greece proper
Ancient Macedonian murder victims
Year of birth unknown
314 BC deaths